This is a list of municipalities in Hungary which have standing links to local communities in other countries known as "town twinning" (usually in Europe) or "sister cities" (usually in the rest of the world).

A
Ábrahámhegy
 Dobruška, Czech Republic

Ajka

 Cristuru Secuiesc, Romania
 Donghai County, China
 Rovaniemi, Finland
 Unna, Germany
 Weiz, Austria

Adony

 Oberweser, Germany
 Szczekociny, Poland
 Cehu Silvaniei, Romania

Albertirsa

 Bourg-Saint-Andéol, France
 Gaggiano, Italy
 Malacky, Slovakia
 Șimleu Silvaniei, Romania
 Żnin, Poland

Algyő

 Hebertsfelden, Germany
 Martonoš (Kanjiža), Serbia
 Uivar, Romania

Alsózsolca

 Matei, Romania
 Plešivec, Slovakia

Aszód

 Miercurea Nirajului, Romania
 Obernburg, Germany 
 Tăuții-Măgherăuș, Romania

B

Ba
Bábolna

 Mariagerfjord, Denmark
 Mostová, Slovakia
 Sieghartskirchen, Austria
 Ypäjä, Finland

Bácsalmás

 Backnang, Germany
 Bajmok (Subotica), Serbia
 Bezdan (Sombor), Serbia
 Bizovac, Croatia
 Borsec, Romania
 Gizałki, Poland
 Veľký Meder, Slovakia

Baja

 Argentan, France
 Hódmezővásárhely, Hungary
 Labin, Croatia
 Sângeorgiu de Pădure, Romania
 Sombor, Serbia
 Târgu Mureş, Romania
 Thisted, Denmark
 Waiblingen, Germany

Baktalórántháza

 Ciumani, Romania
 Dány, Hungary
 Łańcut, Poland
 Nenince, Slovakia
 Ráckeve, Hungary
 Tiachiv, Ukraine

Balassagyarmat

 Dej, Romania
 Heimenkirch, Germany
 Lamezia Terme, Italy
 Ostrołęka, Poland
 Slovenské Ďarmoty, Slovakia

Balatonalmádi

 Băile Tușnad, Romania
 Eggenfelden, Germany

 Nitrianske Hrnčiarovce, Slovakia
 Serock, Poland

Balatonboglár

 Bönnigheim, Germany
 Gródek nad Dunajcem, Poland
 Kalinovac, Croatia
 Loosdorf, Austria
 Ormelle, Italy
 Vlăhița, Romania

Balatonföldvár

 Gaienhofen, Germany
 Kühbach, Germany
 Saint-Georges-de-Didonne, France
 Steckborn, Switzerland
 Ylöjärvi, Finland
 Zetea, Romania

Balatonfüred

 Arpino, Italy
 Covasna, Romania
 Germering, Germany
 Kouvola, Finland
 Opatija, Croatia

Balatonlelle

 Garešnica, Croatia
 Ramstein-Miesenbach, Germany
 Vlăhița, Romania

Balatonszentgyörgy
 Sfântu Gheorghe, Romania

Balmazújváros

 Gulbene, Latvia
 Łańcut, Poland
 Tiachiv, Ukraine
 Valea lui Mihai, Romania

Baracs

 Montois-la-Montagne, France
 Vlăhița, Romania

Barcs

 Knittelfeld, Austria
 Odorheiu Secuiesc, Romania
 Sinsheim, Germany
 Virovitica, Croatia
 Želiezovce, Slovakia

Bátaszék

 Besigheim, Germany
 Ditrău, Romania
 Tekovské Lužany, Slovakia

Bátonyterenye

 Fiľakovo, Slovakia
 Giresun, Turkey
 Jirkov, Czech Republic
 Kobylnica, Poland

Battonya

 Beočin, Serbia
 Lipova, Romania
 Pecica, Romania

Be–Bo
Békés

 Gheorgheni, Romania
 Myszków, Poland
 Novi Itebej (Žitiště), Serbia

Békéscsaba

 Beiuş, Romania
 Krompachy, Slovakia
 Martin, Slovakia
 Mikkeli, Finland
 Odorheiu Secuiesc, Romania
 Tarnowskie Góry, Poland
 Trenčín, Slovakia
 Uzhhorod, Ukraine
 Wittenberg, Germany
 Zrenjanin, Serbia

Bercel

 Căpâlnița, Romania
 Modrý Kameň, Slovakia

Berettyóújfalu

 Marghita, Romania  
 Montegrotto Terme, Italy  
 Porcia, Italy  
 Vyshny Volochyok, Russia

Biatorbágy

 Dolný Štál, Slovakia
 Herbrechtingen, Germany
 Kiti, Cyprus
 Remetea, Romania
 Velyka Dobron, Ukraine

Bicske

 Altshausen, Germany
 Băile Tușnad, Romania
 Chop, Ukraine
 Reci, Romania

Bonyhád

 Borsec, Romania

 Jastrowie, Poland
 Pančevo, Serbia
 Siculeni, Romania
 Treuchtlingen, Germany
 Tvrdošovce, Slovakia
 Wernau, Germany

Borsodnádasd
 Smižany, Slovakia

Bu
Budakalász

 Ada, Serbia
 Kahl am Main, Germany 
 Lueta, Romania 

Budakeszi

 Balog nad Ipľom, Slovakia
 Biecz, Poland
 Delbrück, Germany
 Dyida, Ukraine
 Lich, Germany
 Miercurea Ciuc, Romania
 Neckarsulm, Germany
 Sankt Margarethen an der Raab, Austria

Budaörs

 Bretzfeld, Germany
 Kanjiža, Serbia
 Nová Vieska, Slovakia 
 Pula, Croatia
 Pyrgos, Greece

Budapest

 Ankara, Turkey
 Beijing, China
 Berehove, Ukraine
 Berlin, Germany
 Bethlehem, Palestine
 Florence, Italy
 Fort Worth, United States
 Frankfurt am Main, Germany
 Kraków, Poland
 Lisbon, Portugal
 New York City, United States
 Odorheiu Secuiesc, Romania
 Sarajevo, Bosnia and Herzegovina
 Shanghai, China
 Tehran, Iran
 Tel Aviv, Israel
 Zagreb, Croatia

Budapest I – Budavár

 Capestrano, Italy
 Carouge, Switzerland
 Innere Stadt (Vienna), Austria
 Lendava, Slovenia
 Marlow, England, United Kingdom
 Mukachevo, Ukraine
 Odorheiu Secuiesc, Romania
 Old Town (Bratislava), Slovakia
 Prague 1 (Prague), Czech Republic
 Regensburg, Germany
 Savonlinna, Finland
 Senta, Serbia
 Śródmieście (Warsaw), Poland

Budapest II

 Beşiktaş, Turkey
 Finike, Turkey
 Mosbach, Germany
 Żoliborz (Warsaw), Poland

Budapest III – Óbuda-Békásmegyer

 Bemowo (Warsaw), Poland
 Billigheim, Germany
 Büyükçekmece, Turkey
 Miercurea Ciuc, Romania
 Old Town (Košice), Slovakia
 Stirling, Scotland, United Kingdom

Budapest V – Belváros-Lipótváros

 Bačka Topola, Serbia
 Charlottenburg-Wilmersdorf (Berlin), Germany
 Gheorgheni, Romania
 Inlăceni (Atid), Romania
 Old Town (Kraków), Poland

 Rakhiv, Ukraine
 Rimetea, Romania
 Rožňava, Slovakia

Budapest VI – Terézváros

 Târgu Secuiesc, Romania
 Temerin, Serbia
 Zadar, Croatia 

Budapest VII – Erzsébetváros

 Karlovac, Croatia
 Nevers, France
 Safed, Israel

 Stari Grad (Belgrade), Serbia
 Stavroupoli, Greece
 Sveti Vlas (Nesebar), Bulgaria

Budapest VIII – Józsefváros
 Pescina, Italy

Budapest IX – Ferencváros

 Berehove, Ukraine
 Kanjiža, Serbia
 Kráľovský Chlmec, Slovakia
 Sfântu Gheorghe, Romania

Budapest X – Kőbánya

 Bălan, Romania
 Jarosław, Poland
 Letovice, Czech Republic
 Litochoro, Greece
 Štúrovo, Slovakia
 Vinkovci, Croatia
 Wolverhampton, England, United Kingdom

Budapest XI – Újbuda

 Ada, Serbia
 Bad Cannstatt (Stuttgart), Germany
 Bahçelievler, Turkey
 Bene, Ukraine
 Berehove Raion, Ukraine
 District 1 (Ho Chi Minh City), Vietnam
 Prague 5 (Prague), Czech Republic
 Ruse, Bulgaria
 Sânzieni, Romania
 Târgu Mureș, Romania
 Trogir, Croatia
 Trstice, Slovakia
 Ustroń, Poland
 Yiwu, China
 Żoliborz (Warsaw), Poland

Budapest XII – Hegyvidék
 Arad, Romania

Budapest XIII

 Floridsdorf (Vienna), Austria
 Košice-Juh (Košice), Slovakia
 Ochota (Warsaw), Poland
 Osijek, Croatia
 Sovata, Romania

Budapest XIV – Zugló

 Ciceu, Romania
 Opava, Czech Republic
 Racibórz, Poland
 Racoş, Romania
 Steglitz-Zehlendorf (Berlin), Germany

Budapest XV

 Dabas, Hungary
 Donji Kraljevec, Croatia
 Liesing (Vienna), Austria
 Linyi, China
  Marzahn-Hellersdorf (Berlin), Germany
 Nad jazerom (Košice), Slovakia
 Obervellach, Austria
 Sanming, China
 Topliţa, Romania

Budapest XVI
 Tây Hồ District (Hanoi), Vietnam

Budapest XVII – Rákosmente

 Gheorgheni, Romania
 Krosno County, Poland
 Lovran, Croatia

Budapest XVIII – Pestszentlőrinc-Pestszentimre

 Artashat, Armenia
 Băile Tușnad, Romania
 Dąbrowa County, Poland
 Izvoru Crișului, Romania
 Moldava nad Bodvou, Slovakia
 Nesebar, Bulgaria
 Nin, Croatia
 Roding, Germany
 San Nicola la Strada, Italy
 Tiachiv, Ukraine

Budapest XIX – Kispest

 Krzeszowice, Poland
 Pendik, Turkey
 Smolyan, Bulgaria
 Sombor, Serbia
 Tășnad, Romania
 Vrbovec, Croatia

Budapest XX – Pesterzsébet

 Alushta, Ukraine
 Belin, Romania
 Cristuru Secuiesc, Romania
 Nowa Słupia, Poland
 Olgiate Comasco, Italy
 Nord-Ost (Frankfurt), Germany

Budapest XXI – Csepel

 Băile Tușnad, Romania
 Gănești, Romania
 Kielce, Poland
 Rijeka, Croatia
 Salonta, Romania

 Wołomin, Poland

Budapest XXII – Budafok-Tétény

 Baraolt, Romania
 Białołęka (Warsaw), Poland
 Bonn (Bonn), Germany

 Koson, Ukraine
 Kristianstad, Sweden
 Primorski District (Varna), Bulgaria

Budapest XXIII – Soroksár

 Nürtingen, Germany
 Odorheiu Secuiesc, Romania
 Törökbálint, Hungary
 Tvarditsa, Bulgaria

Bük

 Illingen, Germany
 Törökbálint, Hungary

C
Cegléd

 Gheorgheni, Romania
 Miercurea Ciuc, Romania
 Mühldorf, Germany
 Odorheiu Secuiesc, Romania
 Plauen, Germany
 Sfântu Gheorghe, Romania
 Vasvár, Hungary
 Vlăhița, Romania

Celldömölk

 Mukachevo, Ukraine
 Neudau, Austria
 Pagnacco, Italy
 Sângeorgiu de Pădure, Romania
 Serramazzoni, Italy

Császártöltés

 Deggenhausertal, Germany
 Krenglbach, Austria

Csenger

 Covasna, Romania
 Hauenstein, Germany
 Negrești-Oaș, Romania
 Tășnad, Romania
 Vetiș, Romania

Csobánka
 Wertheim, Germany

Csókakő

 Byczyna, Poland
 Malinovo, Slovakia

Csömör

 Mojmírovce, Slovakia
 Rimetea, Romania

Csongrád

 Bečej, Serbia
 Bełchatów, Poland

 Breuilaufa, France
 Le Buis, France
 Chamboret, France
 Chaptelat, France
 Nantiat, France
 Nieul, France
 Raisio, Finland
 Saint-Jouvent, France
 Thouron, France
 Vaulry, France

Csopak

 Kavarna, Bulgaria
 Myślenice, Poland
 Ortovero, Italy
 Sovata, Romania

Csorna

 Dingzhou, China
 Lunca de Sus, Romania
 Miercurea Nirajului, Romania
 Sinzing, Germany
 Zlaté Klasy, Slovakia

Csorvás

 Ozun, Romania
 Senta, Serbia
 Sládkovičovo, Slovakia

Csurgó

 Aumale, France
 Cristuru Secuiesc, Romania
 Đurđevac, Croatia
 Haimhausen, Germany
 Vráble, Slovakia
 Vrsar, Croatia

D
Dabas

 Abrud, Romania
 Aiton, Romania
 Albenga, Italy
 Banská Bystrica, Slovakia
 Baraolt, Romania
 Budapest XV (Budapest), Hungary
 Kalinkovo, Slovakia
 Mukachevo, Ukraine
 Senta, Serbia
 Staunton, United States
 Tržič, Slovenia

Dány

 Baktalórántháza, Hungary
 Ciumani, Romania
 Ráckeve, Hungary
 Nenince, Slovakia

Debrecen

 Brno, Czech Republic
 Cattolica, Italy
 Jyväskylä, Finland
 Klaipėda, Lithuania
 County Limerick, Ireland
 Lublin, Poland
 New Brunswick, United States
 North-Eastern AO (Moscow), Russia
 Oradea, Romania
 Paderborn, Germany
 Patras, Greece
 Rishon LeZion, Israel
 Saint Petersburg, Russia
 Setúbal, Portugal
 Shumen, Bulgaria
 Syktyvkar, Russia
 Taitung, Taiwan
 Toluca, Mexico
 Tongliao, China

Decs
 Čoka, Serbia

Derecske

 Cristuru Secuiesc, Romania
 Držkovce, Slovakia
 Koszyce, Poland
 Huedin, Romania
 Mátraderecske, Hungary

Deszk

 Dealu, Romania
 Donnery, France
 Dumbrava, Romania
 Königstein, Germany
 Ninove, Belgium
 Novi Kneževac, Serbia 
 Rakhiv, Ukraine
 Wiesenbach, Germany

Dévaványa
 Cristuru Secuiesc, Romania

Diósd

 Alsbach-Hähnlein, Germany
 Brâncovenești, Romania
 Cieszanów, Poland
 Keť, Slovakia

 Velyki Heivtsi, Ukraine

Domaszék

 Bački Vinogradi (Subotica), Serbia
 Lueta, Romania
 Wolbrom, Poland

Dombegyház
 Iratoșu, Romania

Dombóvár

 Kernen im Remstal, Germany
 Ogulin, Croatia
 Vir, Croatia
 Höganäs, Sweden

Dorog

 Feliceni, Romania
 Marienberg, Germany
 Wendlingen, Germany
 Žirany, Slovakia

Dunaharaszti
 Altdorf bei Nürnberg, Germany

Dunakeszi

 Casalgrande, Italy
 Cristuru Secuiesc, Romania
 Ravda (Nesebar), Bulgaria
 Stary Sącz, Poland

Dunaszeg
 Trstice, Slovakia

Dunaszentgyörgy

 Ghelința, Romania
 Nieste, Germany
 Senta, Serbia

Dunaújváros

 Alchevsk, Ukraine
 Elbasan, Albania
 Giurgiu, Romania
 İnegöl, Turkey

 Silistra, Bulgaria
 Sremska Mitrovica, Serbia
 Terni, Italy
 Villejuif, France

Dunavarsány

 Chetfalva, Ukraine
 Gemmingen, Germany
 Slavec, Slovakia

E
Ebes
 Polička, Czech Republic

Edelény

 Bad Sobernheim, Germany
 Moldava nad Bodvou, Slovakia
 Siewierz, Poland
 Worb, Switzerland

Eger

 Cheboksary, Russia
 Dolný Kubín, Slovakia
 Esslingen am Neckar, Germany
 Gheorgheni, Romania
 Jericho, Palestine
 Kutná Hora, Czech Republic
 Mâcon, France
 Mukachevo, Ukraine
 Pori, Finland
 Przemyśl, Poland
 Sarzana, Italy

Emőd
 Praid, Romania

Encs

 Bad Dürrenberg, Germany
 Ghelința, Romania
 Kępno, Poland
 Moldava nad Bodvou, Slovakia

Enying

 Bad Urach, Germany
 Huedin, Romania
 Świerklany, Poland
 Yukamenskoye, Russia

Érd

 Kolín, Czech Republic
 Levice, Slovakia
 Lubaczów, Poland
 Poynton, England, United Kingdom
 Reghin, Romania
 Xuzhou, China

Esztergom

 Bamberg, Germany
 Cambrai, France
 Canterbury, England, United Kingdom
 Ehingen, Germany
 Espoo, Finland
 Gniezno, Poland
 Maintal, Germany
 Mariazell, Austria
 Štúrovo, Slovakia

F
Fehérgyarmat
 Nisko, Poland

Felsőzsolca

 Draganovo (Dobrichka), Bulgaria
 Kanjiža, Serbia
 Kráľovský Chlmec, Slovakia
 Lupeni, Romania
 Olsztynek, Poland
 Vyshkovo, Ukraine

Fényeslitke
 Laarne, Belgium

Fonyód

 Borsec, Romania
 Krotoszyn, Poland
 Leipheim, Germany
 Mettet, Belgium
 Nové Zámky, Slovakia

Fót
 Bălăușeri, Romania

G
Gárdony

 Gieboldehausen, Germany 
 Kirchbach, Austria
 Lesquin, France
 Mörlenbach, Germany
 Postbauer-Heng, Germany
 Salo, Finland
 Valea Crișului, Romania
 Żary, Poland

Göd

 Marignane, France
 Monthey, Switzerland
 Paleu, Romania
 Yanoshi, Ukraine

Gödöllő

 Aichach, Germany
 Bad Ischl, Austria
 Beit Aryeh-Ofarim, Israel

 Bogor, Indonesia
 Brandýs nad Labem-Stará Boleslav, Czech Republic
 Dunajská Streda, Slovakia
 Forssa, Finland
 Giessen, Germany
 Laxenburg, Austria
 Miercurea Ciuc, Romania
 Senta, Serbia
 Turnhout, Belgium
 Valdemoro, Spain
 Wageningen, Netherlands
 Zhangzhou, China
 Żywiec, Poland

Gyál
 Chibed, Romania

Gyomaendrőd

 Aiud, Romania
 Pilzno, Poland
 Schöneck, Germany

Gyömrő

 Regéc, Hungary
 Štvrtok na Ostrove, Slovakia

Gyöngyös

 Luohe, China
 Manisa, Turkey
 Pieksämäki, Finland
 Ringsted, Denmark
 Sanok, Poland
 Štip, North Macedonia
 Târgu Secuiesc, Romania
 Zeltweg, Austria

Gyönk

 Bar-le-Duc, France
 Darmstadt, Germany
 Griesheim, Germany
 Wilkau-Haßlau, Germany

Győr

 Brașov, Romania
 Colmar, France
 Erfurt, Germany
 Ingolstadt, Germany
 Kuopio, Finland
 Nizhny Novgorod, Russia
 Nof HaGalil, Israel
 Poznań, Poland
 Sindelfingen, Germany
 Wuhan, China

Győrújbarát

 Neulingen, Germany
 Rubiera, Italy
 Thorigné-Fouillard, France

Gyula

 Arad, Romania

 Budrio, Italy
 Covasna, Romania
 Ditzingen, Germany
 Krumpendorf am Wörther See, Austria
 Miercurea Ciuc, Romania
 Schenkenfelden, Austria
 Wągrowiec, Poland

H
Hajdúböszörmény

 Berehove, Ukraine
 Harkány, Hungary
 Joseni, Romania
 Kraśnik, Poland
 Montesilvano, Italy
 Salonta, Romania
 Siilinjärvi, Finland
 Trogir, Croatia
 Újrónafő, Hungary

Hajdúdorog

 Lubartów, Poland
 Miercurea Nirajului, Romania
 Odorheiu Secuiesc, Romania
 Ștei, Romania

Hajdúhadház
 Łęczna, Poland

Hajdúnánás

 Piešťany, Slovakia
 Ustroń, Poland
 Valea lui Mihai, Romania

Hajdúsámson

 Belene, Bulgaria
 Sândominic, Romania

Hajdúszoboszló

 Bad Dürrheim, Germany
 Dzierżoniów, Poland
 Kežmarok, Slovakia
 Lanškroun, Czech Republic
 Târnăveni, Romania

Halásztelek

 Ilieni, Romania
 Leisnig, Germany
 Nikopol, Bulgaria
 Oggiono, Italy
 Polikraishte (Gorna Oryahovitsa), Bulgaria
 Rousínov, Czech Republic

Harkány

 Bačko Petrovo Selo (Bečej), Serbia
 Băile Tușnad, Romania
 Bruchköbel, Germany
 Crikvenica, Croatia
 Hajdúböszörmény, Hungary
 Kurchatov, Russia
 Szczawnica, Poland
 Trogir, Croatia

Hatvan

 Barberino Tavarnelle, Italy
 Berehove, Ukraine
 Jarocin, Poland
 Kokkola, Finland
 Maassluis, Netherlands
 Nižný Hrušov, Slovakia
 Târgu Secuiesc, Romania

Helvécia

 Cârța, Romania
 Sirnach, Switzerland
 Vršac, Serbia
 Zatín, Slovakia

Heves

 Breganze, Italy
 Ciumani, Romania
 Miercurea Ciuc, Romania 
 Sulejów, Poland
 Tornaľa, Slovakia

Hévíz

 Čazma, Croatia
 Guilin, China
 Herbstein, Germany
 Pfungstadt, Germany
 Pyatigorsk, Russia

Hódmezővásárhely

 Arad, Romania
 Baia Mare, Romania
 Baja, Hungary
 Brețcu, Romania
 Bruckneudorf, Austria
 Debeljača (Kovačica), Serbia
 Hechingen, Germany
 Kelmė, Lithuania
 Kiskunhalas, Hungary

 Senta, Serbia
 Sokobanja, Serbia
 Solotvyno, Ukraine
 Tamar, Israel
 Turda, Romania

 Vallauris, France
 Vidin, Bulgaria
 Zgierz, Poland

I
Ibrány

 Głogów Małopolski, Poland
 Gornești, Romania
 Gradisca d'Isonzo, Italy  
 Krásnohorská Dlhá Lúka, Slovakia

Inárcs

 Ada, Serbia
 Bene, Ukraine
 Reci, Romania
 Rytro, Poland
 Trstice, Slovakia

Isaszeg

 Bojanów, Poland
 Cozmeni, Romania
 Kechnec, Slovakia

 Sânmartin, Romania
 Suza (Kneževi Vinogradi), Croatia
 Trstená, Slovakia

Iváncsa

 Beckerich, Luxembourg
 Joseni, Romania

J
Jánoshalma

 Băile Tușnad, Romania
 Corund, Romania
 Mirebeau, France
 Nawojowa, Poland
 Rafainovo, Ukraine
 Srbobran, Serbia
 Temerin, Serbia

Jászapáti

 Glodeni, Romania

 Kamenín, Slovakia
 Temerin, Serbia

Jászárokszállás
 Tarłów, Poland

Jászberény

 Conselve, Italy
 Lajosmizse, Hungary
 Lunca de Sus, Romania
 Sângeorgiu de Mureș, Romania
 Sedalia, United States
 Sucha Beskidzka, Poland
 Tiachiv, Ukraine
 Topoľčany, Slovakia
 Vechta, Germany
 Yazd, Iran

Jászfényszaru

 Borș, Romania
 Hat, Ukraine
 Kiskunfélegyháza, Hungary
 Zakliczyn, Poland

K

Ka–Ke
Kalocsa

 Altino, Italy
 Bethlehem, Palestine
 Cristuru Secuiesc, Romania
 Kirchheim unter Teck, Germany
 Kula, Serbia

 Totana, Spain

Kaposvár

 Bath, England, United Kingdom
 Cần Thơ, Vietnam
 Darkhan, Mongolia
 Glinde, Germany
 Koprivnica, Croatia
 Miercurea Ciuc, Romania
 Rauma, Finland
 Saint-Sébastien-sur-Loire, France
 Schio, Italy
 Tver, Russia
 Üsküdar, Turkey

Kapuvár

 Biharia, Romania
 Dębica, Poland
 Dębica (rural gmina), Poland
 Mattersburg, Austria
 Svishtov, Bulgaria

Karcag

 Cristuru Secuiesc, Romania
 Krosno Odrzańskie, Poland
 Kunszentmiklós, Hungary
 Longueau, France
 Merki District, Kazakhstan
 Moldava nad Bodvou, Slovakia
 Schwarzheide, Germany
 Stara Moravica (Bačka Topola), Serbia

Kazincbarcika

 Burgkirchen an der Alz, Germany
 Dimitrovgrad, Bulgaria
 Knurów, Poland
 Revúca, Slovakia
 Sânnicolau Mare, Romania
 Świdnica, Poland

Kecel

 Lupeni, Romania
 Schwarzenbruck, Germany

Kecskemét

 Aomori, Japan
 Berehove, Ukraine
 Coventry, England, United Kingdom
 Dornbirn, Austria
 Galanta, Slovakia
 Hyvinkää, Finland
 Lidköping, Sweden
 Nahariya, Israel
 Rüsselsheim am Main, Germany
 Sfântu Gheorghe, Romania
 Târgu Mureș, Romania
 Tekirdağ, Turkey
 Wadowice, Poland

Kenderes

 Kozy, Poland
 Predappio, Italy
 Sabinov, Slovakia
 Sânmartin, Romania

Kerekegyháza

 Hamuliakovo, Slovakia

Kerepes

 Dealu, Romania
 Dolné Obdokovce, Slovakia
 Hořice, Czech Republic
 Pabianice, Poland

Keszthely

 Alanya, Turkey
 Boppard, Germany
 Hof van Twente, Netherlands
 Jędrzejów, Poland
 Levoča, Slovakia
 Odorheiu Secuiesc, Romania
 Piwniczna-Zdrój, Poland
 Stary Sącz, Poland
 Turnov, Czech Republic

Ki
Kisbér

 Câmpia Turzii, Romania
 Eslohe, Germany
 Kolárovo, Slovakia
 Vodňany, Czech Republic

Kiskőrös

 Krimpen aan den IJssel, Netherlands
 Lapua, Finland
 Liptovský Mikuláš, Slovakia
 Marghita, Romania
 Nesvady, Slovakia
 Stadtlengsfeld (Dermbach), Germany
 Tarnów, Poland
 Zhenjiang, China

Kiskunfélegyháza

 Bagnols-sur-Cèze, France
 Braunfels, Germany
 Corund, Romania
 Die, France
 Feltre, Italy
 Jászfényszaru, Hungary
 Kikinda, Serbia
 Rabka-Zdrój, Poland
 Sighișoara, Romania

 Turda, Romania
 Uhrovec, Slovakia

Kiskunhalas

 Aizkraule, Latvia
 Hódmezővásárhely, Hungary
 Kanjiža, Serbia
 Kronach, Germany
 Nowy Sącz, Poland
 Sfântu Gheorghe, Romania
 Subotica, Serbia

Kiskunmajsa

 Bačka Topola, Serbia
 Bad Schönborn, Germany
 Baiyin, China
 Gheorgheni, Romania
 Lommatzsch, Germany
 Lubliniec, Poland
 Ukmergė, Lithuania

Kistarcsa

 Beluša, Slovakia
 Fanchykovo, Ukraine
 Milovice, Czech Republic
 Radomyśl nad Sanem, Poland
 Turia, Romania

Kistelek

 Gerace, Italy
 Poręba, Poland

Kisújszállás

 Eberschwang, Austria
 Pačir (Bačka Topola), Serbia
 Săcele, Romania
 Serne, Ukraine
 Spišská Nová Ves, Slovakia
 Wilamowice, Poland

Kisvárda

 Hildburghausen, Germany
 Karmiel, Israel
 Kráľovský Chlmec, Slovakia
 Mukachevo, Ukraine
 Strzyżów, Poland
 Târgu Secuiesc, Romania

Ko–Ku
Komárom

 Gratwein-Straßengel, Austria
 Khust, Ukraine
 Komárno, Slovakia
 Lieto, Finland
 Naumburg, Germany
 Sebeș, Romania
 Sosnowiec, Poland

Komló

 Beiuș, Romania
 Éragny, France
 Neckartenzlingen, Germany
 Torrice, Italy
 Valpovo, Croatia

Kondoros

 Atid, Romania
 Gabčíkovo, Slovakia
 Hanhofen, Germany
 Kikinda, Serbia
 Tekovské Lužany, Slovakia

Körmend

 Heinävesi, Finland
 Fürstenfeld, Austria

 Kranenburg, Germany
 Rožnov pod Radhoštěm, Czech Republic
 Yuzhne, Ukraine

Környe

 Praid, Romania
 Tvrdošovce, Slovakia

Kőszeg is a member of the Douzelage, a town twinning association of towns across the European Union. Kőszeg also has four other twin towns.

Douzelage
 Agros, Cyprus
 Altea, Spain
 Asikkala, Finland
 Bad Kötzting, Germany
 Bellagio, Italy
 Bundoran, Ireland
 Chojna, Poland
 Granville, France
 Holstebro, Denmark
 Houffalize, Belgium
 Judenburg, Austria
 Marsaskala, Malta
 Meerssen, Netherlands
 Niederanven, Luxembourg
 Oxelösund, Sweden
 Preveza, Greece
 Rokiškis, Lithuania
 Rovinj, Croatia
 Sesimbra, Portugal
 Sherborne, England, United Kingdom
 Sigulda, Latvia
 Siret, Romania
 Škofja Loka, Slovenia
 Sušice, Czech Republic
 Tryavna, Bulgaria
 Türi, Estonia
 Zvolen, Slovakia
Other
 Mödling, Austria
 Senec, Slovakia
 Senj, Croatia
 Vaihingen an der Enz, Germany

Kozármisleny

 Kopačevo (Bilje), Croatia
 Ocna Mureș, Romania
 Orimattila, Finland
 Pag, Croatia
 Sezze, Italy
 Várda, Hungary

Kunhegyes

 Baia Sprie, Romania
 Feketić (Mali Iđoš), Serbia
 Szerzyny, Poland

Kunszentmárton
 Teterow, Germany

Kunszentmiklós

 Băicoi, Romania
 Blumberg, Germany
 Chepa, Ukraine
 Cristuru Secuiesc, Romania
 Karcag, Hungary
 Miggiano, Italy
 Skorenovac (Kovin), Serbia
 Suhindol, Bulgaria
 Trzemeszno, Poland
 Xagħra, Malta
 Zadvarje, Croatia

L
Lajosmizse

 Felsőlajos, Hungary
 Jászberény, Hungary
 Palić (Subotica), Serbia
 Remetea, Romania

Lenti

 Bad Radkersburg, Austria
 Lendava, Slovenia
 Mursko Središće, Croatia

Lőrinci
 Sankt Lorenz, Austria

M
Mád

 Heidenrod, Germany
 Vranov nad Topľou, Slovakia

Maglód

 Bene, Ukraine
 Dlhá Ves, Slovakia
 Lueta, Romania
 Mýtne Ludany, Slovakia

Magyarcsanád
 Gănești, Romania

Makó

 Ada, Serbia
 Atça (Sultanhisar), Turkey
 Bodo (Balinț), Romania
 Dumbrava, Romania
 Jasło, Poland
 Kiryat Yam, Israel
 Lugoj, Romania
 Martinsicuro, Italy
 Maumee, United States
 Miercurea Ciuc, Romania
 Radomsko, Poland

 Rusko Selo (Kikinda), Serbia

 Xinyang, China
 Želiezovce, Slovakia

Marcali

 Künzelsau, Germany
 Medulin, Croatia
 Morrovalle, Italy
 Toplița, Romania

Martfű

 Tăuții-Măgherăuș, Romania
 Tuchów, Poland

Mátészalka

 Carei, Romania
 Humenné, Slovakia
 Kolbuszowa, Poland
 Mukachevo, Ukraine 
 Oberkochen, Germany
 Vittoria, Italy
 Zevenaar, Netherlands

Mezőberény

 Gronau, Germany
 Kolárovo, Slovakia
 Münsingen, Germany
 Sovata, Romania

Mezőhegyes

 Mordano, Italy
 Ozun, Romania
 Peregu Mare, Romania
 San Giorgio di Nogaro, Italy
 Târgu Secuiesc, Romania
 Túrkeve, Hungary

Mezőkovácsháza

 Moneasa, Romania
 Praid, Romania
 Semlac, Romania 
 Vinga, Romania

Mezőkövesd

 Bad Salzungen, Germany
 Petriolo, Italy
 Rüdesheim am Rhein, Germany
 Târgu Secuiesc, Romania
 Żory, Poland

Mezőtúr

 Arcuș, Romania
 Blatná na Ostrove, Slovakia
 Maków Podhalański, Poland
 Novi Bečej, Serbia
 Valea Crișului, Romania

Miskolc

 Asan, South Korea
 Aschaffenburg, Germany
 Burgas, Bulgaria
 Cleveland, United States
 Katowice, Poland
 Kayseri, Turkey
 Košice, Slovakia
 Ostrava, Czech Republic
 Tampere, Finland

 Yantai, China

Mohács

 Beli Manastir, Croatia
 Bensheim, Germany
 Beykoz, Turkey
 Câmpia Turzii, Romania
 Siemianowice Śląskie, Poland
 Sveti Filip i Jakov, Croatia
 Wattrelos, France

Mór

 Freudenberg, Germany
 Miercurea Nirajului, Romania
 Valdobbiadene, Italy
 Wolsztyn, Poland

Mórahalom

 Chamerau, Germany
 Evje og Hornnes, Norway
 Fiumalbo, Italy
 Jimbolia, Romania
 Pievepelago, Italy
 Sânmartin, Romania
 Temerin, Serbia
 Uniejów, Poland

Mosonmagyaróvár

 Berehove, Ukraine
 Hattersheim am Main, Germany
 Neusiedl am See, Austria
 Olováry, Slovakia
 Pezinok, Slovakia 
 Piotrków Trybunalski, Poland
 Šamorín, Slovakia
 Senec, Slovakia
 Sfântu Gheorghe, Romania
 Stockerau, Austria

N
Nádudvar

 Sălard, Romania
 Urzędów, Poland

Nagyatád

 Debeljača (Kovačica), Serbia
 Križevci, Croatia
 Nußloch, Germany
 San Vito al Tagliamento, Italy
 Târgu Secuiesc, Romania
 Tvrdošovce, Slovakia

Nagycenk is a member of the Charter of European Rural Communities, a town twinning association across the European Union. Nagycenk also has one other twin town.

Charter of European Rural Communities
 Bienvenida, Spain
 Bièvre, Belgium
 Bucine, Italy
 Cashel, Ireland
 Cissé, France
 Desborough, England, United Kingdom
 Esch (Haaren), Netherlands
 Hepstedt, Germany
 Ibănești, Romania
 Kandava (Tukums), Latvia
 Kannus, Finland
 Kolindros, Greece
 Lassee, Austria
 Medzev, Slovakia
 Moravče, Slovenia
 Næstved, Denmark
 Nadur, Malta
 Ockelbo, Sweden
 Pano Lefkara, Cyprus
 Põlva, Estonia
 Samuel (Soure), Portugal
 Slivo Pole, Bulgaria
 Starý Poddvorov, Czech Republic
 Strzyżów, Poland
 Tisno, Croatia
 Troisvierges, Luxembourg
 Žagarė (Joniškis), Lithuania
Other
 Deutschkreuz, Austria

Nagyecsed

 Berveni, Romania
 Perechyn, Ukraine

Nagyhegyes

 Gănești, Romania
 Gelenau, Germany
 Puchaczów, Poland

Nagykálló

 Borša, Slovakia
 Limanowa, Poland
 Metzingen, Germany
 Miguelturra, Spain
 Tășnad, Romania
 Tiachiv, Ukraine

Nagykanizsa

 Acre, Israel
 Bihać, Bosnia and Herzegovina
 Čakovec, Croatia
 Covasna, Romania
 Gleisdorf, Austria
 Kanjiža, Serbia
 Kazanlak, Bulgaria

 Puchheim, Germany
 Salo, Finland
 Shijiazhuang, China
 Tolyatti, Russia

Nagykáta

 Alfonsine, Italy
 Negotino, North Macedonia
 Ozun, Romania

Nagykőrös

 Castrocaro Terme e Terra del Sole, Italy
 Espelkamp, Germany 
 Haaksbergen, Netherlands
 Reghin, Romania
 Salonta, Romania

Nagykovácsi

 Andovce, Slovakia
 Bolatice, Czech Republic
 Canéjan, France
 Linum (Fehrbellin), Germany
 Poggio Mirteto, Italy
 Stupava, Slovakia

Nagymaros

 Gabčíkovo, Slovakia
 Grevesmühlen, Germany
 Velyki Heivtsi, Ukraine

Nyékládháza
 Chrzanów, Poland

Nyergesújfalu

 Karlsdorf-Neuthard, Germany
 Neu Wulmstorf, Germany

Nyírbátor

 Carei, Romania
 Khust, Ukraine
 Rawa Mazowiecka, Poland
 Șimleu Silvaniei, Romania
 Vynohradiv, Ukraine

Nyíregyháza

 Baia Mare, Romania
 Bielsko-Biała, Poland
 Harbin, China
 Iserlohn, Germany
 Kajaani, Finland
 Kiryat Motzkin, Israel
 Prešov, Slovakia
 Rzeszów, Poland
 Satu Mare, Romania
 St Albans, England, United Kingdom
 Uzhhorod, Ukraine

Nyírmada
 Jasov, Slovakia

Nyírtelek
 Veľký Šariš, Slovakia

O
Ócsa

 Dalgety Bay and Hillend, Scotland, United Kingdom
 Kose, Estonia
 Plášťovce, Slovakia

Örkény

 Dvory nad Žitavou, Slovakia
 Koson, Ukraine

 Miercurea Nirajului, Romania
 Ulieș, Romania
 Wörth an der Donau, Germany

Orosháza

 Băile Tușnad, Romania
 Carei, Romania
 Kuusankoski (Kouvola), Finland
 Llanes, Spain
 Panjin, China
 Srbobran, Serbia
 Zomba, Hungary

Oroszlány

 Końskie, Poland
 Kuhmo, Finland
 Plochingen, Germany
 Šaľa, Slovakia

Ózd

 Bichiș, Romania
 Chorzów, Poland
 Neaua, Romania
 Rimavská Sobota, Slovakia
 Veľký Blh, Slovakia

P
Paks

 Galanta, Slovakia
 Gornji Vakuf-Uskoplje, Bosnia and Herzegovina

 Loviisa, Finland
 Novovoronezh, Russia
 Reichertshofen, Germany
 Târgu Secuiesc, Romania
 Vyshkovo, Ukraine

Pápa

 Casalecchio di Reno, Italy
 Covasna, Romania

 Gorlice, Poland
 Hurbanovo, Slovakia
 Kampen, Netherlands
 Leinefelde-Worbis, Germany
 Lučenec, Slovakia
 Schwetzingen, Germany
 Vyshkovo, Ukraine

Pásztó
 Ruffec, France

Pécel

 Mistelbach, Austria
 Iisalmi, Finland

Pécs

 Arad, Romania
 Beyoğlu, Turkey
 Cluj-Napoca, Romania
 Fellbach, Germany
 Graz, Austria
 Kraków, Poland
 Kütahya, Turkey
 Lahti, Finland

 Novi Sad, Serbia
 Olomouc, Czech Republic
 Osijek, Croatia
 Seattle, United States
 Shiraz, Iran
 Shkodër, Albania
 Sliven, Bulgaria
 Terracina, Italy
 Tucson, United States
 Tuzla, Bosnia and Herzegovina
 Zagreb, Croatia

Pécsvárad

 Hausmannstätten, Austria
 Jur nad Hronom, Slovakia
 Külsheim, Germany 
 Pannonhalma, Hungary
 Satu Mare, Romania 
 Unterschleißheim, Germany 
 Velyki Berehy, Ukraine

Pilis
 Piazza al Serchio, Italy

Piliscsév

 Igram, Slovakia
 Tvrdošovce, Slovakia

Pilisvörösvár

 Borsec, Romania
 Gerstetten, Germany
 Gröbenzell, Germany

Polgárdi

 Dinkelland, Netherlands
 Grafrath, Germany
 Petrești, Romania
 Vlčany, Slovakia

Pomáz

 Krzywiń, Poland
 Oberhausen-Rheinhausen, Germany 

Püspökladány

 Fischamend, Austria
 Ghindari, Romania
 Hämeenlinna, Finland
 Hattem, Netherlands
 Krasnystaw, Poland

Putnok

 Fécamp, France
 Ludgeřovice, Czech Republic
 Nowy Żmigród, Poland
 Tisovec, Slovakia
 Tornaľa, Slovakia

R
Rácalmás
 Dransfeld, Germany

Ráckeve

 Baktalórántháza, Hungary
 Calden, Germany 
 Ciumani, Romania
 Dány, Hungary
 Kovin, Serbia
 Nenince, Slovakia
 Shom, Ukraine

Rajka

 Deutsch Jahrndorf, Austria
 Hamuliakovo, Slovakia

Rimóc

 Dłutów, Poland
 Kalonda, Slovakia
 Rosice, Czech Republic
 Sic, Romania
 Strenči, Latvia
 Zmajevac (Kneževi Vinogradi), Croatia

S

Sa
Sajószentpéter

 Dobšiná, Slovakia
 Kobiór, Poland
 Šternberk, Czech Republic

Salgótarján

 Banská Bystrica, Slovakia
 Gliwice, Poland
 Kemerovo, Russia
 Lučenec, Slovakia
 Uricani, Romania
 Vantaa, Finland
 Vigarano Mainarda, Italy

Sándorfalva

 Baragiano, Italy
 Dumbrăvița, Romania
 Loitz, Germany
 Novi Bečej, Serbia

Sárbogárd

 Bene, Ukraine
 Zetea, Romania

Sarkad

 Baraolt, Romania
 Niestetal, Germany 
 Salonta, Romania
 Snagov, Romania

Sárospatak

 Bardejov, Slovakia
 Collegno, Italy
 Eisenach, Germany
 Izvoru Crișului, Romania
 Jindřichův Hradec, Czech Republic
 Krosno, Poland

 Soest, Germany
 Tekirdağ, Turkey

Sárvár

 Seini, Romania
 Sonntagberg, Austria
 Steinheim an der Murr, Germany
 Uherské Hradiště, Czech Republic

Sátoraljaújhely

 Krosno, Poland

 Opole Lubelskie, Poland
 Sărățeni, Romania
 Sindos, Greece
 Waadhoeke, Netherlands

Si–Su
Siklós

 Aiud, Romania
 Donji Miholjac, Croatia
 Feldbach, Austria
 Fornovo di Taro, Italy
 Moldava nad Bodvou, Slovakia

Simontornya

 Marpingen, Germany
 Miercurea Nirajului, Romania
 Milies, Greece
 Steinberg, Germany

Siófok

 Daruvar, Croatia
 Gheorgheni, Romania
 Landsberg am Lech, Germany
 Netanya, Israel
 Oulu, Finland
 Pärnu, Estonia
 Poreč, Croatia
 Puerto Vallarta, Mexico
 Saint-Laurent-du-Var, France
 Waldheim, Germany
 Walnut Creek, United States

Solt

 Dănești, Romania
 Habichtswald, Germany
 Kerava, Finland

Soltvadkert

 Aiud, Romania
 Bodelshausen, Germany
 Sărmășag, Romania

Sopron

 Bad Wimpfen, Germany
 Banská Štiavnica, Slovakia
 Bolzano, Italy
 Eilat, Israel
 Eisenstadt, Austria
 Kazuno, Japan
 Kempten, Germany
 Mediaș, Romania
 Rorschach, Switzerland
 Seinäjoki, Finland
 Sparta, Greece

Sümeg

 Aichtal, Germany

 Sovata, Romania
 Tapolca, Hungary
 Vobarno, Italy

Sz
Szarvas

 Baraolt, Romania
 Bucine, Italy
 Keuruu, Finland
 Malacky, Slovakia
 Poprad, Slovakia
 Șimleu Silvaniei, Romania
 Vlăhița, Romania

Százhalombatta

 Brzesko, Poland
 Sannazzaro de' Burgondi, Italy
 Sovata, Romania

Szécsény

 Fiľakovo, Slovakia
 Kováčovce, Slovakia
 Niepołomice, Poland
 Warta, Poland

Szeged

 Cambridge, England, United Kingdom
 Darmstadt, Germany
 Kotor, Montenegro
 Larnaca, Cyprus
 Liège, Belgium
 Łódź, Poland
 Nice, France
 Odesa, Ukraine
 Parma, Italy
 Pula, Croatia
 Rakhiv, Ukraine
 Subotica, Serbia
 Târgu Mureș, Romania
 Timișoara, Romania
 Toledo, United States
 Turku, Finland
 Weinan, China

Székesfehérvár

 Alba Iulia, Romania
 Biograd na Moru, Croatia
 Birmingham, United States
 Blagoevgrad, Bulgaria
 Bratislava, Slovakia
 Cento, Italy
 Chorley, England, United Kingdom
 Erdenet, Mongolia
 Kemi, Finland
 Kocaeli, Turkey
 Luhansk, Ukraine
 Miercurea Ciuc, Romania
 Opole, Poland
 Schwäbisch Gmünd, Germany
 Zadar, Croatia

Szekszárd

 Bečej, Serbia
 Bezons, France
 Bietigheim-Bissingen, Germany
 Făget, Romania
 Jajce, Bosnia and Herzegovina
 Lugoj, Romania
 Ravenna Province, Italy
 Tornio, Finland
 Waregem, Belgium

Szendrő
 Leutershausen, Germany

Szentendre

 Barbizon, France
 Godmanchester, England, United Kingdom
 Hội An, Vietnam
 Huntingdon, England, United Kingdom
 Kruševac, Serbia
 Salon-de-Provence, France
 Stari Grad, Croatia
 Târgu Secuiesc, Romania
 Uusikaupunki, Finland
 Wertheim, Germany
 Zalău, Romania

Szentes

 Bačka Topola, Serbia
 Buñol, Spain
 Dumbrăvița, Romania
 Hof Ashkelon, Israel
 Kaarina, Finland
 Markgröningen, Germany
 Sankt Augustin, Germany
 Sfântu Gheorghe, Romania
 Skierniewice, Poland
 Svätuše, Slovakia

Szentgotthárd

 Delle, France
 Dilovası, Turkey
 Frumoasa, Romania
 Izola, Slovenia
 Lendava, Slovenia
 Tarvisio, Italy
 Walldürn, Germany

Szerencs

 Geisenheim, Germany
 Hesperange, Luxembourg
 Malchin, Germany
 Miercurea Nirajului, Romania
 Podgora, Croatia
 Pułtusk, Poland
 Rožňava, Slovakia

Szigethalom

 Fiľakovo, Slovakia
 Jaworzno, Poland
 Söderhamn, Sweden

Szigetszentmiklós

 Busko-Zdrój, Poland
 Gheorgheni, Romania
 Gorna Oryahovitsa, Bulgaria
 Kočani, North Macedonia
 Oulu, Finland
 Specchia, Italy
 Steinheim, Germany
 Sveti Martin na Muri, Croatia

Szigetvár

 Čakovec, Croatia
 Deva, Romania
 Eppingen, Germany
 Imatra, Finland
 Pag, Croatia
 Slatina, Croatia
 Trabzon, Turkey

Szolnok

 Baia Mare, Romania
 Bengbu, China
 Bielsko-Biała, Poland
 Eastwood, England, United Kingdom
 Forlì, Italy
 Jinzhong, China
 Rakvere, Estonia
 Reutlingen, Germany
 Riihimäki, Finland
 Sanmenxia, China
 Shoham, Israel
 Yuza, Japan

Szombathely

 Ferrara, Italy
 Hunedoara, Romania
 Kaufbeuren, Germany
 Kolding, Denmark
 Kutaisi, Georgia
 Lappeenranta, Finland
 Lecco, Italy
 Maribor, Slovenia
 Nõmme (Tallinn), Estonia
 Oberwart, Austria
 Ramat Gan, Israel
 Santiago do Cacém, Portugal
 Trnava, Slovakia
 Uzhorod, Ukraine
 Yantai, China
 Yoshkar-Ola, Russia

T

Ta
Tamási

 Isernhagen, Germany
 Montigny-en-Gohelle, France
 Pyiterfolvo, Ukraine
 Stollberg, Germany
 Suchy Las, Poland
 Volgodonsk, Russia
 Wurzen, Germany

Tápiógyörgye

 Dosolo, Italy
 Rimetea, Romania
 Rivarolo del Re ed Uniti, Italy
 Veľký Meder, Slovakia
 Wünnewil-Flamatt, Switzerland
 Zibido San Giacomo, Italy

Tápiószecső
 Ciceu, Romania

Tápiószentmárton

 Bălăușeri, Romania
 Kolinec, Czech Republic
 Zemianska Olča, Slovakia

Tapolca

 Este, Italy
 Lempäälä, Finland
 Ružinov (Bratislava), Slovakia
 Stadthagen, Germany
 Sümeg, Hungary
 Zăbala, Romania

Tarcal
 Moldava nad Bodvou, Slovakia

Tard

 La Croix-Helléan, France
 Guillac, France
 Josselin, France

Tárnok

 Mădăraș, Romania
 Trnávka, Slovakia

Tát

 Buseck, Germany
 Căpleni, Romania
 Molln, Austria
 Obid, Slovakia

Tata

 Alkmaar, Netherlands
 Arenzano, Italy
 Bystřice, Czech Republic
 Dammarie-lès-Lys, France
 Gerlingen, Germany
 Kanjiža, Serbia
 Montebelluna, Italy
 Pińczów, Poland
 Sovata, Romania
 Svodín, Slovakia

Tatabánya

 Aalen, Germany
 Banská Štiavnica, Slovakia
 Będzin, Poland
 Christchurch, England, United Kingdom
 Izhevsk, Russia
 Odorheiu Secuiesc, Romania
 Pyiterfolvo, Ukraine

Te–Ti
Téglás

 Affalterbach, Germany  
 Fulnek, Czech Republic
 Ludwin, Poland
 Tyihlash, Ukraine

Tihany

 Deidesheim, Germany
 Mauges-sur-Loire, France
 Odorheiu Secuiesc, Romania

Tiszaföldvár

 Bačko Gradište (Bečej), Serbia
 Gräfenberg, Germany
 Hérimoncourt, France
 Mielec, Poland

Tiszafüred
  
 Chotěboř, Czech Republic
 Płońsk, Poland
 Senta, Serbia

Tiszakécske

 Lübbecke, Germany
 Lunca de Sus, Romania

Tiszalúc
 Gănești, Romania

Tiszanána

 Baranów, Poland
 Nána, Slovakia
 Zetea, Romania

Tiszaújváros

 Berehove, Ukraine
 Dexing, China
 Friesenheim (Ludwigshafen), Germany
 Miercurea Ciuc, Romania
 Neuhofen an der Krems, Austria
 Rimavská Sobota, Slovakia
 Świętochłowice, Poland
 Zawiercie County, Poland

Tiszavasvári

 Baia Sprie, Romania
 Izvoru Crișului, Romania
 Livada, Romania
 Șimleu Silvaniei, Romania

To–Tu
Tokaj

 Binyamina-Giv'at Ada, Israel
 Cormons, Italy
 Dej, Romania
 Iwonicz-Zdrój, Poland

 Oestrich-Winkel, Germany
 Rust, Austria
 Sonoma, United States
 Supetar, Croatia

Tolna

 Ozun, Romania
 Palić (Subotica), Serbia
 Stutensee, Germany

Törökbálint

 Bük, Hungary
 Odorheiu Secuiesc, Romania
 Soroksár (Budapest), Hungary
 Süßen, Germany
 Veľké Trakany, Slovakia

Törökszentmiklós

 Lendava, Slovenia
 Nevetlenfolu, Ukraine
 Ryglice, Poland
 Senta, Serbia
 Sic, Romania

Tótkomlós

 Brețcu, Romania
 Galanta, Slovakia
 Jelšava, Slovakia

 Nădlac, Romania
 Neunkirchen am Brand, Germany
 Zvolen, Slovakia

Tura

 Jasov, Slovakia
 Sântimbru, Romania

Túrkeve

 Auchel, France
 Mezőhegyes, Hungary
 Porąbka, Poland
 Salonta, Romania
 Velykyi Bychkiv, Ukraine

U
Újfehértó

 Braniștea, Romania
 Cherechiu, Romania
 Doberdò del Lago, Italy
 Hut, Ukraine
 Váhovce, Slovakia
 Żarów, Poland

Újszász

 Auzeville-Tolosane, France
 Ciceu, Romania
 Dębica (rural gmina), Poland
 Palić (Subotica), Serbia

V
Vác

 Deuil-la-Barre, France
 Donaueschingen, Germany
 Dubnica nad Váhom, Slovakia
 Givatayim, Israel
 Järvenpää, Finland
 Odorheiu Secuiesc, Romania
 Otrokovice, Czech Republic
 Šahy, Slovakia
 Sarıyer, Turkey
 Tiachiv, Ukraine
 Zawadzkie, Poland

Várpalota

 Borgo San Lorenzo, Italy
 Czeladź, Poland
 Grottazzolina, Italy
 Gazipaşa, Turkey
 Kremnica, Slovakia
 Petroşani, Romania
 Sant'Elpidio a Mare, Italy
 Wolfsberg, Austria

Vásárosnamény

 Berehove, Ukraine
 Medijana (Niš), Serbia
 Ølgod (Varde), Denmark
 Sastamala, Finland
 Veľké Kapušany, Slovakia

Vecsés

 Lăzarea, Romania
 Rheinstetten, Germany

Velence

 Agia Varvara, Greece
 Ralingen, Germany
 Rosport-Mompach, Luxembourg
 Round Hill, United States

Veresegyház

 Atia (Corund), Romania
 Šahy, Slovakia  
 Schneeberg, Germany

Veszprém

 Bottrop, Germany
 Fresagrandinaria, Italy
 Gladsaxe, Denmark
 Most, Czech Republic
 Nitra, Slovakia
 Nowa Sól, Poland
 Ottignies-Louvain-la-Neuve, Belgium
 Passau, Germany
 Püttlingen, Germany
 Rovaniemi, Finland
 Saint-Michel-sur-Orge, France
 Senftenberg, Germany
 Sfântu Gheorghe, Romania
 Tarnów, Poland
 Tartu, Estonia
 Tirat Carmel, Israel
 Žamberk, Czech Republic

Villány

 Eislingen, Germany
 Stainz, Austria
 Vețca, Romania
 Zamárdi, Hungary

Visegrád

 Lanciano, Italy
 Obergünzburg, Germany

Z
Zalaegerszeg

 Baraolt, Romania
 Berehove, Ukraine
 Dobrich, Bulgaria
 Gorizia, Italy
 Kherson, Ukraine
 Klagenfurt, Austria
 Krosno, Poland
 Kusel, Germany
 Lendava, Slovenia
 Marl, Germany

 Surgut, Russia
 Târgu Mureş, Romania
 Varaždin, Croatia
 Varkaus, Finland
 Zenica, Bosnia and Herzegovina

Zalakaros

 Asperhofen, Austria

 Puchheim, Germany
 Olesno, Poland

Zalaszentgrót
 Germersheim, Germany

Zamárdi

 Malsch, Germany
 Mošćenička Draga, Croatia
 Ustrzyki Dolne, Poland
 Vețca, Romania
 Villány, Hungary

Zirc

 Baraolt, Romania
 Dertsen, Ukraine
 Nivala, Finland
 Pohlheim, Germany

Zsámbék

 Mărtiniș, Romania
 Miglianico, Italy
 Wettenberg, Germany
 Zawiercie, Poland

References

Hungary
Lists of populated places in Hungary
Foreign relations of Hungary
Hungary geography-related lists
Cities in Hungary